Ricardo "Gato" Pérez Tamayo (born 21 July 1973) is a retired Colombian footballer.

He was president of the América de Cali between 2018 and 2019, at which time the team was champion of the 2019 Torneo Finalización

Club career
Pérez began his professional career with Millonarios, where he would spend most of his playing career. After a wonderful 1993 Copa Mustang (scoring 17 goals in 44 matches), he was bought by "giants" América de Cali for an undisclosed fee. After three years at América, he did not enjoy a lot of confidence from the coach, so he returned on loan to Millonarios. At Millonarios again, he scored 17 goals in 46 matches, being one of the tournament's best players in 1997.

Club Career Stats

International career
Pérez made several appearances for the senior Colombia national football team.

References

External links

1973 births
Living people
Colombian footballers
Colombian expatriate footballers
Colombia international footballers
1993 Copa América players
Millonarios F.C. players
América de Cali footballers
L.D.U. Quito footballers
Sichuan Guancheng players
Al-Ahli Saudi FC players
Al Hilal SFC players
Baniyas Club players
Associação Académica de Coimbra – O.A.F. players
Categoría Primera A players
Ecuadorian Serie A players
Primeira Liga players
Expatriate footballers in Ecuador
Expatriate footballers in China
Expatriate footballers in Saudi Arabia
Expatriate footballers in the United Arab Emirates
Expatriate footballers in Portugal
Colombian expatriate sportspeople in Portugal
UAE First Division League players
Saudi Professional League players
América de Cali presidents
Association football forwards
Footballers from Bogotá